Antonina Alekseyevna Ryzhova (July 5, 1934 – May 1, 2020) was a Soviet competitive volleyball player and Olympic silver medalist. She was born in Moscow, Russia.

References

 , retrieved 2010-12-11.

Soviet women's volleyball players
Olympic volleyball players of the Soviet Union
Volleyball players at the 1964 Summer Olympics
Olympic silver medalists for the Soviet Union
1934 births
Sportspeople from Moscow
2020 deaths
Russian women's volleyball players
Olympic medalists in volleyball
Medalists at the 1964 Summer Olympics